Kozliv is an urban-type settlement in the Ternopil Raion (district) of Ternopil Oblast (province) in western Ukraine. It hosts the administration of Kozliv settlement hromada, one of the hromadas of Ukraine. Population: 

The name Kozliv stems from the Ukrainian noun kozel, meaning goat.

History 

Kozliv was first founded in 1467.

During World War II it was under German occupation from 1941 to 1944.

In 1952, it was a village, there was а distillery, a primary school, a secondary school, a machine tractor station and a Palace of Culture.

It acquired the status of an urban-type settlement in 1961.

In January 1989 the population was 2041 people. 

In January 2013 the population was 1846 people.

Until 18 July 2020, Kozliv belonged to Kozova Raion. The raion was abolished in July 2020 as part of the administrative reform of Ukraine, which reduced the number of raions of Ternopil Oblast to three. The area of Kozova Raion was merged into Ternopil Raion.

Transport 
A railway station is 14 km from Kozliv

References

Urban-type settlements in Ternopil Raion
Populated places established in the 1460s